Stefano Bellone (born 23 April 1955) is an Italian fencer. He won a bronze medal in the team épée event at the 1984 Summer Olympics.

References

1955 births
Living people
Italian male fencers
Olympic fencers of Italy
Fencers at the 1980 Summer Olympics
Fencers at the 1984 Summer Olympics
Fencers at the 1988 Summer Olympics
Olympic bronze medalists for Italy
Olympic medalists in fencing
Fencers from Milan
Medalists at the 1984 Summer Olympics
Universiade medalists in fencing
Universiade gold medalists for Italy
Medalists at the 1983 Summer Universiade